Roman Yevgenyevich Belyayev (born 14 February 1988) is a Russian professional footballer.

Club career
He made his professional debut in the Russian First Division in 2007 for FC Sibir Novosibirsk. In the 2009 Belyayev was sent to FC Chita on loan. He returned the same season.

On 2 August 2010, he made his Russian Premier League debut for Sibir, in a game against FC Tom Tomsk. Prior to that, he made three appearances for Sibir in the Europa League qualifiers against Apollon Limassol and PSV Eindhoven.

References

1988 births
Sportspeople from Novosibirsk
Living people
Russian footballers
Association football forwards
FC Sibir Novosibirsk players
Russian Premier League players
FC Chita players